The Yemen Football Association is the governing body of football in Yemen. The organisation joined FIFA in 1980 as the Yemen Arab Republic, commonly known as North Yemen.

In 2005 the YFA was suspended by FIFA due to serious interference by political authorities in the internal affairs of the association, violating Article 17 of the FIFA Statutes.

Former Presidents

 Ali Al Ashwal 1987-2000
 Mohammed Abdel-ilah Al Qadhi 2000-2006
 Ahmed Saleh Al-Eissi 2006–present

Association staff

References

External links
 Yemen Football Association at the FIFA website.
 Yemen Football Association at AFC site
 Official website

Football
Football in Yemen
Sports organizations established in 1962
Yemen